2,4,6-Triisopropylbenzenesulfonyl azide (trisyl azide) is an organic chemical used as a reagent to supply azide for electrophilic amination reactions, such as for the asymmetric synthesis of unnatural amino acids. Introduction of an azide on the α carbon of carboxylic acid derivative using trisyl azide is an efficient alternative to electrophilic halogenation followed by nucleophilic substitution using anionic azide. Using an oxazolidinone as chiral auxiliary typically gives good induction of the stereochemistry at the α position. Subsequent reduction converts the α-azide to an α-amine.

References

Further reading 
 
 

Arylsulfonamides
Azido compounds
Reagents for organic chemistry
Isopropyl compounds